The Atlantic League was a minor league baseball league that operated between 1896 and 1900 in the Northeastern United States. It was the successor of the Pennsylvania State League, which had operated from 1892 to 1895. The name has subsequently been reused twice, for another short-lived league in 1914, and for a contemporary independent minor league.

History

League champions

 In 1896, eight teams competed; at any point in time, there were six teams active.
 In 1899 and 1900, there were only six teams active at season's end.
Source:

Teams

Notes:
In 1896, New Haven disbanded on July 12; Lancaster entered the league on July 13; New York was expelled on July 13 and was replaced by Philadelphia.
In 1899, Paterson disbanded on July 4, and Scranton followed on July 9.
In 1900, Philadelphia moved to Harrisburg on June 4; Newark and Jersey City disbanded on June 2; the league disbanded on June 14.
Source:

Results by season
Teams denoted in italics disbanded during the season.

1896 (Class A)
April 23–September 13

New York was 30–32 when replaced by Philadelphia

1897 (Class A)
April 26–September 19

1898 (Class B)
April 25–September 10

1899 (Class A)
April 27–August 6

1900 (Class A)
April 30–June 14

Philadelphia was 10–11 when replaced by Harrisburg

Soby Cup
The Soby Cup, made of silver, was given to the league by tobacco businessman Charles Soby of Hartford, Connecticut, in September 1896. In its first season, the cup was to be awarded to the winner of a postseason series between the league's top two teams; in subsequent years, the holder of the cup would play a series against the league's top finishing team.

Standings at the end of the 1896 season, which had Newark finishing first, were formally protested by the Paterson team, claiming that some of Newark's games were actually exhibitions. With that protest pending, the next two teams in the standings—Paterson and Hartford—arranged to play a series for the Soby Cup. Paterson won the seven-game series, four games to two. The protested standings were not ruled upon until the league's annual meeting in late November; despite inconsistencies in record-keeping, Newark was declared the pennant winner.

Following the 1897 season, the Soby Cup series should have been contested between Lancaster, that year's top team, and Paterson, who had won the cup in 1896. However, league officials decided to have the top two teams of 1897—Lancaster and Newark—play for the cup. After Lancaster and Newark could not agree to terms for a series, the Soby Cup was awarded to Lancaster, the pennant winner.

Prior to the 1898 season, the league abolished the postseason Soby Cup series, and returned to the cup to its donor. By 1951, the cup was at the Baseball Hall of Fame, where it remains .

Notable players

Notable players in the Atlantic League (1896–1900) include:

 Oyster Burns
 Bill Carrick
 Bill Clymer
 Joe Delahanty
 Ned Garvin
 Dan Kerwin
 Fred Ketchum
 Sam Leever
 John Newell
 Jerry Nops
 Hal O'Hagan
 Casey Patten
 Socks Seybold
 Lee Viau
 Tom Vickery
 Honus Wagner
 Piggy Ward
 Harry Wilhelm
 Rasty Wright
 Joe Yeager

See also
 Atlantic Association

References

Defunct minor baseball leagues in the United States
Sports leagues established in 1896
1896 establishments in the United States
1900 disestablishments in the United States